Legislative elections were held in Taiwan on 19 December 1992.

Background 
The Constitution of the Republic of China took effect on December 25, 1947 (36th year of the Republic) and held its first parliamentary election in 1948. Amidst the backdrop of the Chinese Civil War between the Kuomintang nationalist government and the Chinese Communist Party, the National Assembly invoked article 174 of the constitution and implemented the Temporary Provisions against the Communist Rebellion. After the mainland fell to the Communists, the central government retreated to Taiwan thus holding another nationwide elections would be too difficult in the Communist-held areas.

As democratization began in the late 1980s, the government repealed the Temporary Provisions and introduced the Additional Articles of the Constitution of the Republic of China, allowing the electorates residing in the free area to directly elect the president and the complete re-election of the Legislative Yuan.

The result was a victory for the KMT, which won 95 of the 161 seats. Voter turnout was 72.0%.

Results

References

Taiwan
1992 elections in Taiwan
Legislative elections in Taiwan